Tunasan station is a former railway station located on the South Main Line in Muntinlupa, Metro Manila, Philippines. It is the last station within Metro Manila before the province of Laguna on the line. The station was removed in 2009 and the trains no longer stop there since then. It is unknown if it will be rebuilt but there is a possibility for the station before it in Poblacion Muntinlupa has been rebuilt.

Philippine National Railways stations
Railway stations in Metro Manila
Buildings and structures in Muntinlupa